The women's tournament was held from 26 June–1 July 2011 at the Medina Leisure Centre, Newport and Cowes High School, Cowes.

Format
The six teams were split into two groups of three teams. The winner of each group advanced to the semifinals, while the second and third team of the groups played in the quarterfinals.

Teams

Group stage

Group A

Group B

Knockout stage

Quarterfinals

Semifinals

Fifth place game

Bronze medal game

Gold medal game

References

2011 in women's basketball
Women's tournament
International women's basketball competitions hosted by the United Kingdom